Azovsky is a rural locality (a settlement) in Razdorsky Selsoviet, Kamyzyaksky District, Astrakhan Oblast, Russia. The population was 241 as of 2010. There are 3 streets.

Geography 
Azovsky is located 9 km northeast of Kamyzyak (the district's administrative centre) by road. Kamyzyak is the nearest rural locality.

References 

Rural localities in Kamyzyaksky District